Georg Donatus, Hereditary Grand Duke of Hesse (Georg Donatus Wilhelm Nikolaus Eduard Heinrich Karl, 8 November 1906 – 16 November 1937) was the first child of Ernest Louis, Grand Duke of Hesse, and his second wife, Princess Eleonore of Solms-Hohensolms-Lich. He was a nephew of Empress Alexandra and Emperor Nicholas II of Russia.

Marriage and children
On 2 February 1931, at Darmstadt, Georg, a great-grandson of Queen Victoria, married his first cousin once removed, Princess Cecilie of Greece and Denmark, daughter of Prince Andrew of Greece and Denmark and Princess Alice of Battenberg (and thus a sister of Prince Philip of Greece and Denmark (later Prince Philip, Duke of Edinburgh), a great-great-granddaughter of Queen Victoria and Prince Albert. The couple had four children:

On 1 May 1937 Georg Donatus and Princess Cecilie both joined the Nazi Party.

Death
In October 1937, Georg Donatus' father, Grand Duke Ernst Ludwig of Hesse, died. A few weeks after the funeral, the new Grand Duke's younger brother, Prince Louis, was due to be married to the Hon. Margaret Geddes, daughter of Lord Geddes. On 16 November 1937, Georg Donatus, Cecilie, their two young sons, Georg's mother Grand Duchess Eleonore, the children's nurse, a family friend, a pilot and two crewmen, flew from Darmstadt bound for the United Kingdom, where Prince Louis was due to be married. The Junkers Ju-52 aeroplane hit a factory chimney near Ostend and crashed into flames, killing all those on board. Cecilie was heavily pregnant with her fourth child at the time of the crash, and the remains of the newborn baby were found in the wreckage, indicating that Cecilie had gone into labour during the flight; the Belgian inquiry into the crash suggested that the pilot was attempting to land in Ostend despite the poor weather conditions because of the birth.

Aftermath
Prince Louis' wedding had been scheduled for the 20th but, following discussions with his future father-in-law Lord Geddes, was brought forward to the day following the accident (17 November), as a small and quiet ceremony with the guests dressed in mourning.

Immediately afterwards, he set off with his new wife Margaret to Belgium to visit the crash site. The funeral and burial of Georg Donatus and his family took place at the Rosenhöhe, Darmstadt, Hesse, a few days later. Attending were Prince Philip, Prince Christoph of Hesse, Gottfried, Prince of Hohenlohe-Langenburg, Prince Philipp of Hesse, Berthold, Margrave of Baden, Prince August Wilhelm of Prussia and Lord Louis Mountbatten, among others. A photograph of the funeral procession, showing Prince Louis as chief mourner, shows crowds saluting the mourners with the Hitler salute. World War II began less than two years later.

The Hereditary Grand Duke and Duchess' fourteen-month-old daughter, Johanna, was the only one of the family who was not on board the aircraft. She was adopted by her uncle Prince Louis and aunt Princess Margaret in early 1938. Johanna died of meningitis in 1939.

With the death of the childless Prince Louis in 1968, the male line of the Hesse and by Rhine became extinct.

In popular culture
The crash figures in the plot of A Matter of Honour by Jeffrey Archer, in which Grand Duke Georg has in his possession the jewels of his aunt, the last Tsarina of Russia, which the KGB are looking for. There is no evidence in reality that this was the case.

He is depicted in the Netflix series The Crown portrayed by German actor August Wittgenstein.

Titles
 8 November 1906 – 16 November 1937: His Royal Highness The Hereditary Grand Duke of Hesse and by Rhine

Georg Donatus never acceded to the grand ducal throne as it had been abolished at the end of the First World War. Titles became surnames after that point, and it was rare for the head of a royal, grand ducal or ducal family to change his title upon accession as  head of a house.

Ancestry

Patrilineal descent
Gilbert I, Count of the Maasgau, d. 842
Gilbert II, Count of the Maasgau, 825–875
Reginar, Duke of Lorraine, 850–915
Reginar II, Count of Hainaut, 890–932
Reginar III, Count of Hainaut, 920–973
Lambert I, Count of Leuven, 950–1015
Lambert II, Count of Leuven, d. 1054
Henry II, Count of Leuven, 1020–1078
Godfrey I, Count of Leuven, 1060–1139
Godfrey II, Count of Leuven, 1187–1226
Godfrey III, Count of Leuven, 1140–1190
Henry I, Duke of Brabant, 1165–1235
Henry II, Duke of Brabant, 1207–1248
Henry I, Landgrave of Hesse, 1244–1308
Otto I, Landgrave of Hesse, 1272–1328
Louis the Junker of Hesse, 1305–1345
Hermann II, Landgrave of Hesse, 1341–1413
Louis I, Landgrave of Hesse, 1402–1458
Louis II, Landgrave of Hesse, 1438–1471
William II, Landgrave of Hesse, 1469–1509
Philip I, Landgrave of Hesse, 1504–1567
George I, Landgrave of Hesse-Darmstadt, 1547–1596
Louis V, Landgrave of Hesse-Darmstadt, 1577–1626
George II, Landgrave of Hesse-Darmstadt, 1605–1661
Louis VI, Landgrave of Hesse-Darmstadt, 1630–1678
Ernest Louis, Landgrave of Hesse-Darmstadt, 1667–1739
Louis VIII, Landgrave of Hesse-Darmstadt, 1691–1768
Louis IX, Landgrave of Hesse-Darmstadt, 1719–1790
Louis I, Grand Duke of Hesse, 1753–1830
Louis II, Grand Duke of Hesse, 1777–1848
Prince Charles of Hesse and by Rhine,  1809–1877
Louis IV, Grand Duke of Hesse,  1837–1892
Ernest Louis, Grand Duke of Hesse, 1868–1937
Georg Donatus, Hereditary Grand Duke of Hesse, 1906–1937

See also
Sabena OO-AUB Ostend crash
Former German nobility in the Nazi Party

References

1906 births
1937 deaths
House of Hesse-Darmstadt
Princes of Hesse
Hereditary Grand Dukes of Hesse
Heirs apparent who never acceded
Royalty in the Nazi Party
Victims of aviation accidents or incidents in Belgium
Victims of aviation accidents or incidents in 1937
Burials at the Mausoleum for the Grand Ducal House of Hesse, Rosenhöhe (Darmstadt)
Nazi Party members
Sons of monarchs